Ophthalmitis viridior is a moth in the family Geometridae first described by Jeremy Daniel Holloway in 1993. It is found in Borneo and Peninsular Malaysia.

The wingspan is 22–26 mm for males.

External links

Boarmiini
Moths of Borneo
Moths described in 1993